Dino Sokolović (born 17 December 1988) is an alpine skier who won Croatia its first gold at any Winter Paralympics.

References

External links 
 

1988 births
Sportspeople from Zagreb
Living people
Croatian male alpine skiers
Croatian disabled sportspeople
Paralympic alpine skiers of Croatia
Paralympic gold medalists for Croatia
Alpine skiers at the 2018 Winter Paralympics
Medalists at the 2018 Winter Paralympics
Paralympic medalists in alpine skiing